Černovice is a town in Pelhřimov District in the Vysočina Region of the Czech Republic. It has about 1,800 inhabitants.

Administrative parts
Villages of Benešov, Dobešov, Panské Mlýny, Rytov, Střítež, Svatava, Vackov and Vlkosovice are administrative parts of Černovice.

Geography
It lies in the Křemešník Highlands. The town is surrounded by several small ponds.

History
The first written mention of Černovice is from 1322. From 1322 to 1597, it was property of the Rosenberg family. Černovice was burned down during the Hussite Wars and damaged several times by fires between 1611 and 1857, so almost no historical buildings have survived to this day. Černovice was a market town, which was promoted to a town in the mid-19th century.

Sights
The landmark of the town square is the Church of the Exaltation of the Holy Cross. It was a Gothic church from the 14th century, rebuilt in the Baroque style. Next to the church is a separate bell tower.

The Černovice Castle is a late Neoclassical building, surrounded by an extensive landscape park. Today it houses an institute of social care.

Twin towns – sister cities

Černovice is twinned with:
 Biglen, Switzerland

References

External links

Cities and towns in the Czech Republic
Populated places in Pelhřimov District